CJ Ramos is a Filipino actor. He first rose to prominence as a child actor in the 1990s where he notably appeared in a number of movies which include Ang TV Movie: The Adarna Adventure and  Biyudo Si Daddy, Biyuda Si Mommy.

Personal life 
Ramos is the younger half-brother of former GMA Network actor and dancer Sherwin Ordoñez. On July 31, 2018, Ramos was arrested in a drug buy-bust operation in Quezon City. Shortly after he was released, he was given a chance in his acting comeback via FPJ's Ang Probinsyano.

Filmography

Television

Film

Awards and nominations

References

External links

Living people
Place of birth missing (living people)
20th-century Filipino male actors
21st-century Filipino male actors
1987 births